Theo Reinhardt (born 17 September 1990) is a German professional racing cyclist, who currently rides for UCI Continental team . He has competed at the UCI Track Cycling World Championships, every year since 2013.

Major results

Track

2008
 1st  Madison (with Thomas Juhas), National Junior Championships
 3rd  Team pursuit, UEC European Junior Championships
2010
 UEC European Under-23 Championships
2nd  Team pursuit
3rd  Madison (with Ralf Matzka)
2012
 2nd  Team pursuit, UEC European Championships
2013
 3rd  Madison (with Henning Bommel), UCI World Championships
2014
 National Championships
1st  Omnium
1st  Team pursuit
 2nd  Team pursuit, UEC European Championships
2015
 1st  Team pursuit, National Championships
2017
 National Championships
1st  Madison (with Kersten Thiele)
1st  Team pursuit
2018
 1st  Madison (with Roger Kluge), UCI World Championships
 2nd  Madison (with Roger Kluge), UEC European Championships
 3rd Six Days of London (with Roger Kluge)
 3rd Six Days of Berlin (with Roger Kluge)
2019
 1st  Madison (with Roger Kluge), UCI World Championships
 National Championships
1st  Madison (with Maximilian Beyer)
1st  Points
1st  Team pursuit
 1st Six Days of Berlin (with Roger Kluge)
 3rd  Madison (with Maximilian Beyer), UEC European Championships
2020
 3rd  Madison (with Roger Kluge), UCI World Championships
2022
 1st Six Days of Berlin (with Roger Kluge)
 2nd  Elimination, UEC European Championships

Road

2010
 6th Overall Tour du Loir-et-Cher
2011
 1st Stage 4 Tour de Berlin
2013
 2nd Overall Okolo Jižních Čech
1st Stage 1
 5th Overall Tour de Serbie
2015
 1st  Team time trial, National Championships
 1st Stage 3 Okolo Jižních Čech
2017
 1st Stage 3 Dookoła Mazowsza

References

External links
 

1990 births
Living people
German male cyclists
Cyclists from Berlin
Olympic cyclists of Germany
Cyclists at the 2016 Summer Olympics
Cyclists at the 2020 Summer Olympics
UCI Track Cycling World Champions (men)
German track cyclists